The Elder Scrolls III: Bloodmoon is the second expansion pack for The Elder Scrolls III: Morrowind, developed by Bethesda Game Studios. It was originally released as an expansion set for Microsoft Windows and is included within the Morrowind: Game of the Year edition for Xbox.

Unlike the first expansion Tribunal, which added a city separate from the world map consisting of interior cells, Bloodmoon adds a large new island to the original world map, a cold northern territory named Solstheim. Rather than the Dunmer (dark elves) that are the indigenous race in the nearby Vvardenfell, Solstheim is populated largely by the Nord race. This is largely because the island sits more or less astride the border between Morrowind and the Nord homeland of Skyrim.

This expansion adds new enemies, the East Empire Company as a joinable guild, and the possibility to become a werewolf, akin to the inclusion of vampires seen in Morrowind. Bloodmoon also uses larger and more detailed environments, including snowfall, thus raising the computer hardware requirements, though the ash storms of the original game are much more graphically demanding than the snow of Bloodmoon.

As with Morrowind and Tribunal, Bloodmoon has many side-quests to finish and many caves to explore aside from its main quest. Unlike Tribunal, which is intended to be played after the completion of Morrowinds main quest, Bloodmoons main-quest is self-contained within the expansion.

Plot

Setting
Bloodmoon takes place on the island of Solstheim, northwest of Morrowind, the main landmass of its eponymous game, and north-east of Skyrim. It is disputed territory, with both provinces claiming the island.

Story
In the Bloodmoon main quest, the player starts by doing odd jobs for the Imperials' Fort Frostmoth on Solstheim. When the fort is attacked by werewolves, the player must travel to the Nord village of the Skaal at the north of the island. The player must then perform several rituals to be accepted into the village. The player is informed of the Bloodmoon Prophecy, a ritualistic hunt led by the Daedra Lord Hircine. The Daedric Prince takes the four greatest champions on Solstheim, including the player, to his glacier home. He tells them that they must fight until only one is still living; if the player survives, they must fight one of Hircine's aspects - strength (a bear), speed (an elk), or guile (his own form). If the player wins, they must then escape from the crumbling glacier, thereby completing the main quest.

The Elder Scrolls V: Skyrim is also set in the land of Skyrim, another Nordic territory. The Dragonborn DLC also takes place on the island of Solstheim, 200 years after the events of Bloodmoon.

Reception

Bloodmoon was received positively by reviewers, with review aggregator Metacritic indicating the game received "Generally favorable reviews" with an average score of 85 out of 100 based on 21 reviews.

Reviewers praised the open-ended approach of the expansion compared to its predecessor, Tribunal. Steve Butts of IGN was "glad to return to the more-open ended adventuring available in Bloodmoon in contrast to the "cramped setting" of Tribunal. Daniel Wilks of PC PowerPlay similarly praised Bloodmoon for "(opting) for the more freeform style of the original game rather than the heavily scripted linearity of Tribunal."

The design of Solstheim, the setting in Bloodmoon, was also unanimously praised for its novelty and visual appeal. Steve Butts of IGN praised Bloodmoon as a "graphical treat", stating "the snow-shrouded forests of Solstheim provide a welcome change of pace", and "the (snow) particles build up to a virtual blizzard (and) it makes a fantastic visual and convinces you that this is a real world." William Abner of GameSpy praised Solstheim as "an entirely new landscape" that "looks and feels like a foreign land compared to the rest of the settings in Morrowind, not just a tacked-on area."

Reviewers provided particular praise for the main quest and East Empire Company faction, which sees a game area, Raven Rock, change based on player decisions throughout the questline. Matthew Peckham for Computer Games praised the questline as "ingenious", stating "this sort of thoughtful scripting is what sets a Bethesda role-playing experience apart from its peers. Similarly, Ron Dulin of GameSpot praised the "complex" East Empire Company questline, stating "the new quests are at least as engaging as those in the original game and emphasize the best role-playing aspects of the series."

Whilst the inclusion of werewolves and lycanthropy in Bloodmoon was featured by many reviewers as a highlight of the expansion, reviewers were divided on its implementation. Ron Dulin of Computer Gaming World critiqued the feature, stating "the implementation isn't very exciting...the need to feed every night can become fairly tiresome, and because werewolves have only their claws as weapons, combat can get repetitive." GameSpot reviewers agreed, finding that whilst play as a werewolf was "a more interesting and challenging alternative to regular adventuring", the permanent mechanic of being attacked on sight by all characters if being seen transitioning between man and werewolf states was "an artificial mechanic that compromises the otherwise immersive setting".

Many reviewers observed the graphics of Bloodmoon pushed the performance of their system. Daniel Wilks of PC Powerplay noted "(the game's) facelift comes at the price of framerates - even on high-end machines, combat in the snow can cause the game to chug." GameSpot similarly commented that "since Bloodmoon features even more detailed and populated environments (than Morrowind), the practical system requirements have also correspondingly increased...the resulting reduction in frame rates worsens one of the main problems many players had with the original game."

References

External links
 Archived developer diaries.

Bloodmoon
Werewolf video games
Windows games
Xbox games
Video game expansion packs
Video games featuring protagonists of selectable gender
Video games set on fictional islands
Role-playing video games
Action role-playing video games
2003 video games
Bethesda Game Studios games
Open-world video games
Video games developed in the United States
Single-player video games